Mina Gerhardsen (born 14 September 1975) is a Norwegian politician for the Labour Party.

She is the daughter of Rune Gerhardsen and Tove Strand, and granddaughter of Einar Gerhardsen. She is married to Eirik Øwre Thorshaug.

She led the Oslo branch of Natur og Ungdom from 1993 to 1995, and was deputy leader of the Workers' Youth League in Oslo in 1997. She took the cand.mag. degree at the University of Oslo in 1998, and also has master's degrees in pedagogy from 2000 and human geography from 2003. From 1999 to 2002 she worked part-time as a journalist in Dagsavisen and  Dagbladet. She then worked in the Norwegian Red Cross from 2002 to 2004, except for a period from 2003 to 2004 as a journalist in Mandag Morgen.

She was hired as a political advisor in the Norwegian Office of the Prime Minister in 2005, when Stoltenberg's Second Cabinet assumed office. In 2009 she was promoted to State Secretary. In 2011 she changed to the Ministry of Culture.

References

1975 births
Living people
Nature and Youth activists
University of Oslo alumni
Norwegian journalists
Labour Party (Norway) politicians
Politicians from Oslo
Norwegian state secretaries
Norwegian women state secretaries